The 2017 NCAA Division I baseball season, play of college baseball in the United States organized by the National Collegiate Athletic Association (NCAA) at the Division I level, began in February 2017. The season progressed through the regular season, many conference tournaments and championship series, and concluded with the 2017 NCAA Division I baseball tournament and 2017 College World Series.  The College World Series, consisted of the eight remaining teams in the NCAA tournament and held annually in Omaha, Nebraska, at TD Ameritrade Park Omaha, ended June 27, 2017.

Realignment
 Coastal Carolina left the Big South Conference for the Sun Belt Conference. The move officially took effect hours after Coastal won the College World Series. In doing so, the Sun Belt Conference split into East and West divisions for this season.
 North Dakota, a member of the Western Athletic Conference in baseball (as well as swimming and diving for both sexes), dropped baseball.

The 2017 season was also the last for one school's baseball program, and the last for two other programs in their then-current conferences. In addition, the last remaining Division I independent left for its full-time home of Division II.
 Buffalo dropped baseball at the end of the season.
 NYIT, which had been left independent after the 2013 collapse of the Great West Conference, dropped its baseball program to Division II, joining the school's full-time home of the East Coast Conference.
 Valparaiso left its home of the previous 10 seasons, the Horizon League, for the Missouri Valley Conference (MVC).
 Wichita State left the MVC, its conference home since 1945, to become a full but non-football member of the American Athletic Conference.

Season outlook

Conference standings

Conference winners and tournaments
Of the 31 Division I athletic conferences that sponsor baseball, 29 end their regular seasons with a single-elimination tournament or a double-elimination tournament. The teams in each conference that win their regular season title are given the number one seed in each tournament. Two conferences, the Big West and Pac-12, do not hold a conference tournament. The winners of these tournaments, plus the Big West and Pac-12 regular-season champions, receive automatic invitations to the 2017 NCAA Division I baseball tournament.

College World Series

The 2017 College World Series began on June 17 in Omaha, Nebraska.

Award winners

Consensus All-American teams

Major player of the year awards
Dick Howser Trophy: Brendan McKay, 1B/P, Louisville
Baseball America: Brendan McKay, 1B/P, Louisville
Collegiate Baseball/Louisville Slugger: Brendan McKay, 1B/P, Louisville & Brent Rooker, 1B, Mississippi State<ref>{{cite press release|url=http://baseballnews.com/wp-content/uploads/2017/05/2017-Collegiate-Baseball-All-Americans-Release.pdf |title=''Collegiate Baseballs NCAA Div. I All-Americans |publisher=Collegiate Baseball Newspaper |date=June 1, 2017 |access-date=June 19, 2017}}</ref>American Baseball Coaches Association: Brendan McKay, 1B/P, LouisvilleGolden Spikes Award: Brendan McKay, 1B/P, Louisville

Major freshman of the year awardsBaseball America Freshman Of The Year: Matt Wallner, OF/P, Southern MissCollegiate Baseball Freshman Players of the Year: Kevin Milam, DH/P, Saint Mary's; Sean Mooney, P, St. John's; Braden Shewmake, 2B, Texas A&M; Kenyon Yovan, P, Oregon

Major coach of the year awardsAmerican Baseball Coaches Association: Kevin O'Sullivan, FloridaBaseball America: Dan McDonnell, LouisvilleCollegiate Baseball Coach of the Year: Kevin O'Sullivan, FloridaNational Collegiate Baseball Writers Association (NCBWA) National Coach of the Year: Pat Casey, Oregon StateABCA/Baseball America Assistant Coach of the Year:Other major awardsSenior CLASS Award (baseball) (outstanding Senior of the Year in baseball): Anthony Critelli, Holy CrossJohnny Bench Award (Catcher of the Year): Brooks Wallace Award (Shortstop of the Year): Logan Warmoth, North CarolinaJohn Olerud Award (best two-way player): Brendan McKay, LouisvilleAmerican Baseball Coaches Association Gold Glove:'''

Coaching changes
This table lists programs that changed head coaches at any point from the first day of the 2017 season until the day before the first day of the 2018 season.

Attendances

2016 teams with an average home attendance of at least 10,000:

References